Joseph Patrick Hassett (born September 11, 1955) is a retired American basketball player in the National Basketball Association (NBA). A 6'5" (1.96 m) 180 lb (81.5 kg) shooting guard, he played college basketball at Providence College, where he still shares a record with four other players to score at least 500 points in a season in three consecutive years. He also represented the US in the 1975 Pan American Games in Mexico City.

Hassett was selected with the 8th pick in the third round (52nd overall) of the 1977 NBA Draft by the Seattle SuperSonics. He was part of the Sonics' 1979 NBA championship winning team, but moved on to the Indiana Pacers the following season after being released by the Sonics. In his only year with the Pacers (1979–80) he ranked fourth in the league with 69 three-pointers made. He also played with the Dallas Mavericks and Golden State Warriors, with whom he concluded his NBA career in 1982–83.

Hassett is a member of the New England Basketball Hall of Fame, the Providence College Hall of Fame, the Rhode Island Heritage Hall of Fame, and the Rhode Island Interscholastic League Hall of Fame. He is now an investment advisor/banker and provides color commentary for the Providence Friars basketball team on 103.7 FM radio.

Notes

1955 births
Living people
All-American college men's basketball players
American men's basketball players
Basketball players at the 1975 Pan American Games
Dallas Mavericks expansion draft picks
Dallas Mavericks players
Golden State Warriors players
Indiana Pacers players
La Salle Academy alumni
College basketball announcers in the United States
Medalists at the 1975 Pan American Games
Pan American Games gold medalists for the United States
Pan American Games medalists in basketball
Parade High School All-Americans (boys' basketball)
Providence Friars men's basketball announcers
Providence Friars men's basketball players
Seattle SuperSonics draft picks
Seattle SuperSonics players
Shooting guards